Self-defeating personality disorder (also known as masochistic personality disorder) was a proposed personality disorder. As a descriptor for Other personality disorder it was mentioned in the DSM-III in 1980. It was discussed in an appendix of the revised third edition of the Diagnostic and Statistical Manual of Mental Disorders (DSM-III-R) in 1987, but was never formally admitted into the manual. Because of its significant overlap with other personality disorders (borderline, avoidant and dependent) the distinction was not seen as clinically valuable. It was entirely excluded from the DSM-IV. Since the DSM-5, the diagnoses other specified personality disorder and unspecified personality disorder have mostly replaced its use.

Diagnosis

Definition proposed in DSM III-R for further review
Self-defeating personality disorder is:

A) A pervasive pattern of self-defeating behavior, beginning by early adulthood and present in a variety of contexts. The person may often avoid or undermine pleasurable experiences, be drawn to situations or relationships in which they will suffer, and prevent others from helping them, as indicated by at least five of the following:

 chooses people and situations that lead to disappointment, failure, or mistreatment even when better options are clearly available
 rejects or makes ineffective the attempts of others to help them
 following positive personal events (e.g., new achievement), responds with depression, guilt, or a behavior that produces pain (e.g., an accident)
 incites angry or rejecting responses from others and then feels hurt, defeated, or humiliated (e.g., makes fun of spouse in public, provoking an angry retort, then feels devastated)
 rejects opportunities for pleasure, or is reluctant to acknowledge enjoying themselves (despite having adequate social skills and the capacity for pleasure)
 fails to accomplish tasks crucial to their personal objectives despite having demonstrated ability to do so (e.g., helps fellow students write papers, but is unable to write their own)
 is uninterested in or rejects people who consistently treat them well
 engages in excessive self-sacrifice that is unsolicited by the intended recipients of the sacrifice
 The person may often avoid or undermine pleasurable experiences [...] [and] rejects opportunities for pleasure, or is reluctant to acknowledge enjoying themself

B) The behaviors in A do not occur exclusively in response to, or in anticipation of, being physically, sexually, or psychologically abused.

C) The behaviors in A do not occur only when the person is depressed.

Exclusion from DSM-IV
Historically, masochism has been associated with feminine submissiveness. This disorder became politically controversial when associated with domestic violence which was considered to be mostly caused by males. However a number of studies suggest that the disorder is common. In spite of its exclusion from DSM-IV in 1994, it continues to enjoy widespread currency amongst clinicians as a construct that explains a great many facets of human behaviour.

Sexual masochism that "causes clinically significant distress or impairment in social, occupational, or other important areas of functioning" is still in DSM-IV.

Millon's subtypes
Theodore Millon has proposed four subtypes of masochist. Any individual masochist may fit into none, one or more of the following subtypes:

See also 
 Sadistic personality disorder
 Self-handicapping
 Self-preservation
 Setting up to fail
 Autosadism
 Algolagnia
 Learned helplessness

Notes

References

External links 
 http://www.psychnet-uk.com/x_new_site/personality_psychology/personality_disorders_self_defeating.html
 https://www.scribd.com/doc/55533833/The-Riddle-of-Masochism

Obsolete terms for mental disorders
Psychopathological syndromes
Personality disorders